61 may refer to: 
 61 (number)
 one of the years 61 BC, AD 61, 1961, 2061
 In some countries, a slang name for the Cyrillic letter Ы
 61*, a 2001 American sports drama film
 "Sixty One", a song by Karma to Burn from the album Mountain Czar, 2016

See also
List of highways numbered 61